A list of prose works by Robert E. Howard.  The works are sorted by genre, by series and then alphabetically. Untitled works and fragments (incomplete and unfinished works) are listed separately by their opening line.

Additional information is included where available, covering publication date and place, the amount Howard earned for the sale of the piece, any alternative titles and whether the work is in the public domain. Links to the freely available source texts, on wikisource or Project Gutenberg of Australia, are included in a separate column. These are marked with the appropriate icons.

Fantasy stories

Conan the Barbarian 
Howard's most famous creation, the Cimmerian barbarian, thief, pirate and King of Aquilonia during the pre-Ice Age Hyborian Age.

Many of the Conan stories not published during Howard's lifetime were edited by other authors before publication. The Fragment stories have all been completed by others since. Where either has occurred before the publication of the original material, this date is noted after the original material's publication date.

Kull
An Atlantean barbarian and King of Valusia in the ancient Thurian Age (predating Conan's Hyborian Age). He appears in the Bran Mak Morn story "Kings of the Night."

Solomon Kane
A Tudor-period Puritan adventurer, wandering across Europe and Africa.

Bran Mak Morn
The King of the Picts during the Roman invasion of Britain, eventually becoming the subject of a Cthulhu Mythos cult as the "Dark Man". He is referenced in the Kirowan story "The Children of the Night" and features in the Turlough O'Brien story "The Dark Man".

Turlogh Dubh O'Brien
An 11th-century Irish outcast.

James Allison
A 1930s Texan who recalls his past lives as ancient heroes. Not to be confused with Kid Allison.

Other fantasy

Boxing stories

Sailor Steve Costigan
A 1930s sailor and boxer, travelling between ports aboard the tramp steamer Sea Girl.

Sailor Dennis Dorgan
A renamed version of Sailor Steve Costigan sailing in the Python, published under the pseudonym Patrick Ervin.

Kid Allison
Not to be confused with James Allison.

Ace Jessel
A black, happy-go-lucky boxer.

Other Boxing stories

Western stories

Breckinridge Elkins
Humorous stories of a kind, strong but not very smart cowboy.
All stories with the note "(A Gent from Bear Creek)" were later edited together to become part of the 1937 novel A Gent from Bear Creek.

Pike Bearfield

Grizzly Elkins

Buckner Jeopardy Grimes

The Sonora Kid
AKA Steve Allison. He also appears in some of the El Borak stories.

Other Westerns

Historical stories
See also Solomon Kane, Bran Mak Morn and Turlough Dubh O'Brien for historical stories with fantasy elements.

El Borak
A Texan gunman in early 20th Century Afghanistan. Several of the El Borak stories also feature The Sonora Kid.

Dark Agnes de Chastillon
A red-haired swordswoman in 16th Century France.

Cormac Fitzgeoffrey
A Norman/Gael knight fighting in the Crusades.

Kirby O'Donnell
An American posing as a Kurdish mercenary in Central Asia.

Cormac Mac Art
An Irish pirate during the Dark Ages.

Lal Singh

Black Vulmea
An Irish pirate sailing the Caribbean.

Helen Tavrel
Howard's female pirate of the Caribbean.

Other Historical stories

Horror stories

John Kirowan
These stories are part of the Cthulhu Mythos

The Faring Town Saga

De Montour
A Norman werewolf.

Weird West
Weird West stories are hybrids, a combination of a Western with another genre, usually horror, occult, or fantasy.

Other Weird Menace

Other Cthulhu Mythos stories

Other horror stories

Detective stories

Steve Harrison
A police detective, often coming across weird cases on his River Street patrol in Chinatown.

Butch Gorman & Brent Kirby
Private detectives.

Steve Bender, Weary McGraw and the Whale

Comedy stories

Spicy stories
The "Spicy" pulp magazines printed stories that were considered scandalous at the time (elements of nudity and implied sex).

Wild Bill Clanton

Other Spicy stories

"True Adventure" stories

Other stories

Essays and articles

Poetry

Other fragments

 The Atavist (Public Domain)
 Age Lasting Love (First published in La Tombe Du Dragon, 1990. Public Domain)
 The Battling Sailor
 Blue River Blues
 A Boy, a Beehive, and a Chinaman
 The Brand of Satan (Public Domain)
 Circus Charade (Public Domain)
 The Dominant Male (Public Domain)
 The Drawing Card (Public Domain)
 The Drifter (Public Domain)
 A Faithful Servant (Public Domain)
 Fate is the Killer (Public Domain)
 The Feminine of the Species (Public Domain)
 The Ferocious Ape (Public Domain)
 The Fishing Trip (Public Domain)
 Fistic Psychology
 The Folly of Conceit (Public Domain)
 Friends (Public Domain)
 The Funniest Bout (Public Domain)
 The Ghost Behind the Gloves (Public Domain)
 The Ghost of Bald Rock Ranch (Public Domain)
 In His Own Image (Public Domain)
 Incongruity (Public Domain)
 The Influence of the Movies (Public Domain)
 The Ivory Camel (Public Domain)
 The Land of Forgotten Ages (Public Domain)
 The Lion Gate (Public Domain)
 Lobo Volante (Public Domain)

 Man (Public Domain)
 A Man and a Brother (Public Domain)
 A Man of Peace (Public Domain)
 The Man Who Went Back (Public Domain)
 Mr. Dowser Buys a Car (Public Domain)
 Over the Rockies in a Ford (Public Domain)
 Pigskin Scholar (Public Domain)
 The Punch (Public Domain)
 The Recalcitrant (Public Domain)
 The Red Stone (Public Domain)
 The Slayer (Never published. Public Domain)
 A South Sea Storm (Never published. Public Domain)
 The Splendid Brute (Never published. Public Domain)
 Tallyho! (Public Domain)
 Ten Minutes on a Street Corner (Public Domain)
 Through the Ages (Public Domain)
 The Treasure of Henry Morgan (Public Domain)
 A Twentieth-Century Rip Van Winkle (Public Domain)
 A Unique Hat (Public Domain)
 The Weeping Willow
 What the Deuce? (Public Domain)
 The Wheel Turns (Public Domain)
 The White Jade Ring (Public Domain)
 The Wild Man (Public Domain)
 The Wings of the Bat (Public Domain)
 Yellow Laughter (Public Domain)

Other untitled stories

 "As he approached the two, he swept off his feathered hat..."
 "Better a man should remain in kindly ignorance, than..."
 "Between berserk battle-rages, the black despair of melancholy..."
 "Franey was a fool."
 "From the black, bandit-haunted mountains of Kang..."
 "Help! Help! They're murderin' me!"
 "Huh?" I was so dumbfounded I was clean off..."
 "I", said Cuchulain, "was a man, at least."
 "I'm writing this with a piece of pencil on the backs of old..."
 "It was a strange experience, and I don't expect anyone..."
 "A land of wild, fantastic beauty; of mighty trees..."
 "The lazy quiet of the mid-summer day was shattered..."
 "A man", said my friend Larry Aloysius O'Leary..."
 "The matter seemed so obvious that my only answer..."

 "Maybe it doesn't seem like anything interesting and..."
 "Mike Costigan, writer and self-avowed futilist, gazed..."
 "The next day I was sluggish and inefficient in my work..."
 "Old Man Jacobsen crunched his powerful teeth through..."
 "So I set out up the hill-trail as if on a hunt and..."
 "So there I was..."
 "Spike Morissey was as tough a kid as ever came..."
 "The tale has always been doubted and scoffed at..."
 "that is, the artistry is but a symbol for the thought!"
 "Thure Khan gazed out across the shifting vastness..."
 "Trails led through dense jungle..."
 "Two men were standing in the bazaar at Delhi..."
 "You," said Shifty Griddle, pointing his finger at me..."
 "Joe Rogers had been working the stock markets..."

References
This list was based on the following articles:
 The Works of Robert E. Howard
 A Collector's Checklist of Howard's Fiction
 The Robert E. Howard United Press Association
 The Robert-E-Howard: Electronic Amateur Press Association, The Copyright and Ownership Status of the Works and Words of Robert E. Howard by Paul Herman
 Weird Tales Fiction Index

With some additional material from these sources:
 Robert E. Howard: A Library of Classics
  Wikisource (Author:Robert Ervin Howard)
 Project Gutenberg of Australia
 Afterword by Stephen Jones; The Conan Chronicles Volume 1: The People of the Black Circle; 2000;

External links
 

 
Bibliographies by writer
Bibliographies of American writers
Horror fiction bibliographies
Fantasy bibliographies